Yana (born Pamela Guard; 16 February 193121 November 1989) was a British singer who was famous enough to be regarded as a household name in late-1950s Britain, but whose fame faded fast thereafter; by the time of her death in 1989 she was almost completely unknown except to a few devoted fans, though the Daily Telegraph obituaries page noted her demise and included the obituary in one of its published collections.

Early life and work
Yana was born Pamela Guard on 16 February 1931, in the town of Billericay, Essex (her later publicity people thought that it sounded more interesting to describe her as "Cornish-born", and her Christian name was sometimes rendered "Pamella"). As a teenager she became a hairdresser's assistant, and then a fashion model at the Gaby Young modelling agency. Her singing career started when Bertie Green, the owner of the plush Astor Club in London, heard her (aged 19) singing at a private party in the club, her friends having dared her to get up and sing; Green booked her as a cabaret artiste. She also sang, from 1954, at the expensive Pigalle restaurant in Piccadilly. It was not long before she was singing across Britain in the theatres known as the Moss Empires; she started to appear on British television.

Peak fame
The peak of Yana's fame came in the years 1955–1960, when she appeared in her own BBC TV show, The Yana Show (1956), as well as on The Ed Sullivan Show and The Bob Hope Show in the United States.

In 1956, she sang in a cameo role in the film The Cockleshell Heroes, as a member of the Women's Royal Naval Service (part of the Royal Navy). In 1955, she had made a somewhat similar brief appearance (as a civilian singer in the fictional "Coastal Forces Club") in another very British film, The Ship that Died of Shame, based on the Nicholas Monsarrat short novel of the same name.

Yana made yet another brief appearance, as a nightclub singer, in the 1957 British film Interpol (which, like The Cockleshell Heroes, was made by Warwick Films and featured some of the same actors, including Sydney Tafler and Trevor Howard, though top billing went to Hollywood stars Victor Mature and Anita Ekberg).

The recently launched ITV commercial television channel (there was, at the time, only one in the UK) featured Yana in its immensely-popular variety show Sunday Night at the London Palladium from 1955.

In 1955, Yana supported Bob Hope in his tour of American military bases and camps in Iceland (Iceland having been occupied during the Second World War). Hope was quoted in the American press as saying that he had discovered a new singer in Britain, Yana by name, as well as that "she has a beautiful voice and she's England's answer to Marilyn Monroe".

Over the following year, Yana made over 200 TV appearances in the US, Canada and Mexico. She was famous enough by then to be mentioned briefly in American newspapers without needing much introduction, as when the gossip columnist of the Milwaukee Sentinel, Earl Wilson, whose column was syndicated throughout the US, noted (in March 1956) that "the shapely British singer, Yana, is being sought by Columbia Pictures." Yana was read about in such provincial American towns as Sarasota, Florida as well as in Hollywood and New York City.

Yana's biggest hit as a singer was Climb Up the Wall, which is regarded as one of the top 30 British popular songs of the 1950s; despite that and her other recordings (Columbia Records and HMV, mostly), it has been said that Yana's actual earnings from records totalled only about £100 in the money of the time, by reason of the contractual arrangements typically in place for UK recording artists of that era.

The Yana Show was not very successful (some wag of the day dubbed it "The Yawna Show"); it was pulled after less than a dozen episodes. Despite its short run, the show did feature not only famous entertainers of the day, but one or two whose major fame came later, such as the diminutive comedian Ronnie Corbett. Corbett, in his autobiography, High Hopes, described Yana as "the glamorous blonde singer who specialised in plunging necklines and was a tremendous success in the '50s and '60s. But her career had its ups and downs--unlike her neckline, which mostly had its downs." Corbett also noted that, during the run of the show, Yana was having an affair or at least a flirtation with its writer, Digby Wolfe, who later found greater success with That Was The Week That Was and Rowan and Martin's Laugh-In.

Yana appeared rather frequently in pantomimes and in variety shows generally, alongside such British stars as Norman Wisdom, Tommy Steele, Arthur Haynes and even George Formby, with whom she was said to have had an affair.

Personal and later life
Yana kept much of her private life private. She seems to have married at least three times: in 1948 as Pamela Guard; in 1964 as Yana Guard (to Alan Curtis, an actor and pantomime performer); and in 1967 as Yana Curtis. She also had a brief affair with George Formby. In George Formby: an intimate portrait of the troubled genius, David Bret wrote that, "blatantly lesbian despite being thrice-married and with a huge gay following, she was living with an American actress at the time, though George did not know this." Yana had a serious affair with one Thomas MacCallum of Prestwick in Scotland. The family story was that she was supposed to follow him as he moved to the US (but he met someone else on the ship and dropped her).

Yana's style was ultra-feminine even by the standards of the 1950s, and was markedly exuberant. She kissed the Lord Mayor of Newcastle repeatedly during a performance of Climb Up the Wall and, when councillors complained at the loss of civic dignity, offered to visit Newcastle and kiss all of them if they were jealous. She went about with an entourage of white poodles, offered to lend the cosmonaut Yuri Gagarin her car (personalized numberplate YG1) when he visited London in 1961 and, when asked in 1956 what she would do when she visited Hollywood, replied, "buy myself a monkey, darling--I am crazy about animals!" The Daily Telegraph critic described her at the London Palladium in 1957, "encased in a white gown that fitted like a bandage.."

Yana ceased to be a famous name, face and figure in the 1960s: by the 1980s she was working at Boots the Chemists in Marylebone High Street, London and in a chemist shop in Church Street off London's Edgware Road, near her home in Lisson Grove, Marylebone. She was briefly rediscovered, featuring in the British TV nostalgia show Where Are They Now?, and cast in a pantomime, The Wonderful Wizard of Oz (Yana's role was the Good Fairy) in Crewe, Cheshire, but her last job was that of demonstrating a slimming machine at Harrods department store.

Yana developed cancer of the oesophagus, and died on 21 November 1989 aged 58.

References

External links 
 
 
 
 

1932 births
1989 deaths
Deaths from esophageal cancer
British women singers
20th-century English singers
20th-century English women singers
British LGBT singers
20th-century LGBT people